In continuum mechanics the flow velocity in fluid dynamics, also macroscopic velocity in statistical mechanics, or drift velocity in electromagnetism, is a vector field used to mathematically describe the motion of a continuum. The length of the flow velocity vector is the flow speed and is a scalar.
It is also called velocity field; when evaluated along a line, it is called a velocity profile (as in, e.g., law of the wall).

Definition

The flow velocity u of a fluid is a vector field

which gives the velocity of an element of fluid at a position  and time 

The flow speed q is the length of the flow velocity vector

and is a scalar field.

Uses

The flow velocity of a fluid effectively describes everything about the motion of a fluid.  Many physical properties of a fluid can be expressed mathematically in terms of the flow velocity.  Some common examples follow:

Steady flow

The flow of a fluid is said to be steady if  does not vary with time.  That is if

Incompressible flow

That is, if  is a solenoidal vector field.

Irrotational flow

That is, if  is an irrotational vector field.

A flow in a simply-connected domain which is irrotational can be described as a potential flow, through the use of a velocity potential  with  If the flow is both irrotational and incompressible, the Laplacian of the velocity potential must be zero:

Vorticity

The vorticity, of a flow can be defined in terms of its flow velocity by

If the vorticity is zero, the flow is irrotational.

The velocity potential

If an irrotational flow occupies a simply-connected fluid region then there exists a scalar field  such that

The scalar field  is called the velocity potential for the flow. (See Irrotational vector field.)

Bulk velocity 
In many engineering applications the local flow velocity  vector field is not known in every point and the only accessible velocity is the bulk velocity (or average flow velocity)  which is the ratio between the volume flow rate  and the cross sectional area , given by

.

See also

Drift velocity
Enstrophy
Group velocity
Particle velocity
Pressure gradient
Strain rate
Stream function
Velocity gradient
Velocity potential
Vorticity
Wind velocity

References

Fluid dynamics
Continuum mechanics
Vector calculus
Velocity
Spatial gradient
Vector physical quantities